Brian Battistone and Ryler DeHeart were the defending champions but decided not to participate.
Ashley Fisher and Stephen Huss defeated Alex Bogomolov Jr. and Alex Kuznetsov 6–3, 6–4 in the final.

Seeds

  Rik de Voest /  Izak van der Merwe (semifinals)
  Ashley Fisher /  Stephen Huss (champions)
  Brian Dabul /  John Paul Fruttero (withdrew)
  Lester Cook /  Brett Joelson (first round)

Draw

Draw

References
 Main Draw
 Qualifying Draw

Sarasota Open - Doubles
2011 Doubles